The following is a list of episodes for the Australian television programme Tangle. A total of 22 episodes have aired.

Series overview

Episodes

Series 1 (2009)

Series 2 (2010)

Series 3 (2012)

External links

Lists of Australian drama television series episodes